The Belikin La Ruta Maya Belize River Challenge is an annual 4-day canoe marathon held in Belize. It is considered the biggest sporting event in the country, and typically attracts thousands of spectators. It is held each year in March and is scheduled to coincide with the weekend of Baron Bliss Day.

History
The event was first proposed by Richard Harrison, a Belizean investor, as a way to promote a new brand of bottled water. Harrison put together a committee to organize the event and found additional sponsors for services and prizes. Although the original purpose of the race was commercial, Harrison also saw it as an opportunity to raise awareness about the environment and the history and culture of the Belize River. The first race included 31 teams and was won by the Hobb brothers from Bullet Tree Falls. About 50 teams now compete each year.

Results

References

External links

 Official website
 Facebook page

Canoe marathon
Sport in Belize